Drew Christensen (born May 21, 1993) is an American politician and former member of the Minnesota House of Representatives. A Republican, he represented District 56A, which included portions of Dakota County and Scott County in the southwestern part of Minneapolis–Saint Paul Metro.

Early life, education, and career
Christensen was born in Savage, Minnesota.  Throughout high school Christensen was an umpire for baseball and softball in Prior Lake, Minnesota.  He graduated from Prior Lake High School in 2011.  The summer after graduation he worked on his family farm near Garvin, Minnesota.  Christensen attended the University of Minnesota, graduating in December 2015 with a degree in Political Science.  At the university, Christensen served on the Minnesota Student Association and featured as a member of the University of Minnesota Marching Band.  Christensen also served as Treasurer of the Minnesota College Republicans from April 2013-February 2014.  From February 2012-January 2015, Christensen worked for the City of Savage, Minnesota on an Appointed, volunteer Communications Commission to advise the City Council and provide feedback to staff on matters relating to the city's communications program.  He served as Vice Chair of this commission from February 2013-February 2014.

Minnesota House of Representatives

Elections
Christensen was elected on November 4, 2014, defeating Dan Kimmel (DFL) by 11.8% or 1,585 votes.

Committee assignments
For the 89th Legislative Session, Christensen is a part of the:
Aging and Long-Term Care Policy
Education Finance
Education Innovation Policy
Higher Education Policy and Finance
Ban Arie Luyendyk Jr. from Minnesota

Tenure
Christensen was sworn in on January 6, 2015, as the youngest Representative.

In March 2018, Christensen introduced a bill to ban Arie Luyendyk Jr., a winner of the TV Show The Bachelor, from entering the state of Minnesota. He did so because a contestant of the show was from Christensen's home town.

Personal life
Christensen was married in January 2018 and currently resides in Burnsville, Minnesota.

References

External links

http://www.christensenformn.com/ 

1993 births
Living people
People from Savage, Minnesota
Republican Party members of the Minnesota House of Representatives
21st-century American politicians
People from Burnsville, Minnesota